Mustafa Pasha Mosque is an Ottoman-era mosque in Skopje, Macedonia.

Mustafa Pasha Mosque may also refer to:

 Atik Mustafa Pasha Mosque, an Ottoman-era mosque and former Byzantine-era church in Istanbul, Turkey
 Koca Mustafa Pasha Mosque, an Ottoman-era mosque and former Byzantine-era church in Istanbul, Turkey
 Lala Mustafa Pasha Mosque, an Ottoman-era mosque and former medieval church in Famagusta, Northern Cyprus